Adriana van Ravenswaay (1816–1872), was a Dutch painter.

Biography
She was born in Hilversum as the sister of the painter Johannes van Ravenswaay (1815–1849), and like her brother probably had lessons from her uncle Jan van Ravenswaay.	

She is known for fruit and flower still lifes and spent her life and worked in Hilversum.

References

	
Adriana van Ravenswaay on Artnet	
	
	

1816 births
1872 deaths
Dutch women painters
People from Hilversum
19th-century Dutch women artists
19th-century Dutch painters